Gložan is a village located in the Bački Petrovac municipality, in the South Bačka District of Serbia. It is situated in the Autonomous Province of Vojvodina. The population of the village numbering 2,283 people (2002 census), of whom 1,985 are ethnic Slovaks.

Name
In Serbian the village is known as Gložan (Гложан); in Slovak as Hložany; and in Hungarian as Dunagálos.

Historical population
1961: 2,839
1971: 2,682
1981: 2,569
1991: 2,491
2002: 2,283

See also 
 List of places in Serbia
 List of cities, towns and villages in Vojvodina

References
Slobodan Ćurčić, Broj stanovnika Vojvodine, Novi Sad, 1996.

Places in Bačka
South Bačka District
Slovak communities in Serbia
Bački Petrovac